Copthall School (formerly Copthall County Grammar School) is a girls' secondary school and sixth form located in the Mill Hill area of the London Borough of Barnet, England.

The school was formed in 1973 by the amalgamation of Copthall County Grammar School and Woodcroft Secondary Modern. The original 1930s grammar school building has been joined to a new wing of equal size. A new library opened in 1999 and the school received an excellence award from the DfES in 2001.

The school was converted to academy status in October 2012, and was previously a community school under the direct control of Barnet London Borough Council. The school continues to coordinate with Barnet London Borough Council for admissions.

Copthall School offers GCSEs, City and Guilds qualifications and ESOL courses as programmes of study for pupils. Students in the sixth form have the option to study a range of A Levels.

Notable former pupils

Copthall County Grammar School
Alison Dunhill, artist and art historian
Ann McPherson, GP, author and health campaigner
Victoria Miro, art dealer and gallerist

Copthall School
Temi Fagbenle, basketball player

References

External links
Copthall School official website

Secondary schools in the London Borough of Barnet
Academies in the London Borough of Barnet
Girls' schools in London
Mill Hill